Situation and its derivations may refer to:

Situation

Common uses
A concept similar to scenario, relating to a position (location) or  a set of circumstances.
A job

People
 The Situation (TV personality), nickname of American reality TV personality Michael Sorrentino

Arts, entertainment, and media

Music
Situation (album), a 2007 album by Canadian musician Buck 65
Situation (song), a 1982 song by British new wave band Yazoo
 "Situation", a song by Godsmack from their eponymous album

Television
Situation comedy, abbreviated sitcom, a type of television show

Other uses
 Situation (Sartre), a concept by Jean-Paul Sartre
 Rhetorical situation, the context of a rhetorical event
 Situation awareness, the perception of environmental elements and events
 Situation report, abbreviated sitrep

Situated
 Situated, located
 Situated cognition, a theory that posits that knowing is inseparable from doing

Situationism
 Situationism (psychology), which holds that personality is more influenced by external factors than by internal traits or motivations
Situationism, the ideas of Situationist International, an international political and artistic movement of the 1960s
Sitationism, in situational ethics, the idea in ethics that the morality of an act is a function of the state of the system when, or context where it occurs

See also
 The Situation (disambiguation)